Bounded arithmetic is a collective name for a family of weak subtheories of Peano arithmetic. Such theories are typically obtained by requiring that quantifiers be bounded in the induction axiom or equivalent postulates (a bounded quantifier is of the form ∀x ≤ t or ∃x ≤ t, where t is a term not containing x). The main purpose is to characterize one or another class of computational complexity in the sense that a function is provably total if and only if it belongs to a given complexity class. Further, theories of bounded arithmetic present uniform counterparts to standard propositional proof systems such as Frege system and are, in particular, useful for constructing polynomial-size proofs in these systems. The characterization of standard complexity classes and correspondence to propositional proof systems allows to interpret theories of bounded arithmetic as formal systems capturing various levels of feasible reasoning (see below).

The approach was initiated by Rohit Jivanlal Parikh  in 1971, and later developed by Samuel R. Buss.  and a number of other logicians.

Theories

Cook's theory 

Stephen Cook introduced an equational theory  (for Polynomially Verifiable) formalizing feasibly constructive proofs (resp. polynomial-time reasoning). The language of  consists of function symbols for all polynomial-time algorithms introduced inductively using Cobham's characterization of polynomial-time functions. Axioms and derivations of the theory are introduced simultaneously with the symbols from the language. The theory is equational, i.e. its statements assert only that two terms are equal. In addition,  contains axioms replacing the induction axioms for open formulas.

Buss's theories 

(Note that , i.e.  allows to express polynomial bounds in the bit-length of the input.) A formula  is sharply bounded if all quantifiers in the formula are sharply bounded. In particular, .

The theory  consists of a finite list of open axioms denoted BASIC and the polynomial induction schema 

 

where .

Buss's witnessing theorem

Theorem (Buss 1986) 
Then, there exists a -function symbol  such that .

Moreover,  can -define all polynomial-time functions. The characterization can be generalized to higher levels of the polynomial hierarchy.

Correspondence to propositional proof systems

Theories of bounded arithmetic are often studied in connection to propositional proof systems. Similarly as Turing machines are uniform equivalents of nonuniform models of computation such as Boolean circuits, theories of bounded arithmetic can be seen as uniform equivalents of propositional proof systems. The connection is particularly useful for constructions of short propositional proofs. It is often easier to prove a theorem in a theory of bounded arithmetic and translate the first-order proof into a sequence of short proofs in a propositional proof system than to design short propositional proofs directly in the propositional proof system.

The correspondence was introduced by S. Cook.

Informally, a  statement  can be equivalently expressed as a sequence of formulas . Since  is a coNP predicate, each  can be in turn formulated as a propositional tautology  (possibly containing new variables needed to encode the computation of the predicate ).

Theorem (Cook 1975) 
Assume that , where . Then tautologies  have polynomial-size Extended Frege proofs. Moreover, the proofs are constructible by a polynomial-time function and  proves this fact.

Further,  proves the so called reflection principle for Extended Frege system, which implies that Extended Frege system is the weakest proof system with the property from the theorem above: each proof system satisfying the implication simulates Extended Frege.

An alternative translation between second-order statements and propositional formulas given by Jeff Paris and Alex Wilkie (1985) has been more practical for capturing subsystems of Extended Frege such as Frege or constant-depth Frege.

See also

Proof complexity
Computational complexity
Mathematical logic 
Proof theory 
Complexity classes 
NP (complexity)  
coNP

References

Further reading

 (draft from 2008)

 Krajíček, Jan, Proof Complexity, Cambridge University Press, 2019.

External links
 Proof complexity mailing list.

Formal theories of arithmetic